Abdirahman Ali Hassan is a Kenyan politician.  He served  in the government of Kenya as assistant minister for trade and industry from 2005 to 2007. A member of the Orange Democratic Movement, He was elected to represent the Wajir South Constituency in the National Assembly of Kenya in the Kenyan 2002 parliamentary election. He was also elected to the senate of Kenya in 2013, representing Wajir county, and becoming deputy minority leader in the senate.

Early life
Abdirahman went to Wajir primary school, Wajir high school, before being admitted to the university of Nairobi, where he graduated with a Bachelor of developmental studies. He was the  director and programme coordinator oxfam GB in Kenya, from 1998, stepping down when he became Kenya's member of parliament.

Politics
In the 1997 Kenyan general election, Abdirahman contested the Wajir South Constituency parliamentary seat, but lost it.  In the election,  Abdirahman again contested Wajir South. He won the seat, which he held until 2010, becoming the first person to hold the seat two consecutive terms. During his term, he wascredited with the building of 10 schools to increase primary and high school enrollment in the region. He also implemented a major water projects for the Wajir south people during his term and introduced innovative clinics to decrease infant mortality.

References

Members of the National Assembly (Kenya)
Living people
Year of birth missing (living people)
Kenya African National Union politicians